Euchromius gratiosella is a species of moth in the family Crambidae. It is found in Spain, Italy, Russia, Algeria, Turkey, Iran, Turkmenistan, Kazakhstan, Kyrgyzstan, Tadzhikistan and Mongolia.

The wingspan is 15–23 mm.

References

Moths described in 1910
Crambinae
Moths of Europe
Moths of Africa
Moths of Asia